Colotenango is a town and municipality in the Guatemalan department of Huehuetenango. The annual festival is  August 12–15.

Colotenango has two holy sites called Tuikalajan and Tuisanmarcos.

Demographics
Colotenango is traditionally a Maya community whose residents speak the Mayan Mam language. Two-thirds of the residents are Catholic, while about thirty percent are Evangelica.

Aldeas
Colotenango includes the following aldeas (towns), Colotenango (el pueblo), El Granadillo, Ical, Ixconlaj, La Barranca, La Vega, Tojlate, Luminoche,  Tixel, and Xemal.

References

External links
in Spanish
 Municipal map.

Municipalities of the Huehuetenango Department